The Puntland–Somaliland dispute is a territorial dispute over the provinces of Sool, Sanaag and the Buuhoodle district of Togdheer region between the self-declared Republic of Somaliland and the Puntland state of Somalia.

Background

1894 border

The territory was historically part of British Somaliland, a British protectorate that granted independence in 1960 and then formed a union with neighboring Italian colony Trust Territory of Somaliland to form the Somali Republic. When the Somaliland War of Independence was concluded and the Somali Civil War broke out, Somaliland declared independence from Somalia in 1991 as a successor state to the British protectorate and declared independence from Somalia.

The dispute started in 1998, when Puntland was formed as an autonomous state of Somalia and declared the region as part of its territory based on tribal affiliation of the locals.

Clan border
Puntland claims Sool, Sanaag and Cayn based on kinship ties with the regions' dominant Darod clans. Somaliland claims the territory as part of the original boundaries of the former British Somaliland protectorate, which the self-declared country regards itself as the successor to. Fighting between the two forces led to casualties and captured prisoners, who were later exchanged.

In 2010, the Dhulbahante clan declared the independence of the HBM-SSC, and when that failed, in 2012, proclaimed the independence of Khatumo State, claiming all three territories for themselves independent of both Somaliland and Puntland, thereby forming a new, third faction in the conflict. However, Khatumo State also lost territorial control around 2015.

Sanaag
Sanaag is a disputed region, claimed as sovereign territory by Somaliland and Puntland State of Somalia.

One of the battlefront as of 2021 is between Yubbe (Somaliland) and Hadaftimo (Puntland).

The dispute with the Transitional Federal Government (TFG) stems from the passage of the new Charter in November 2004. However, this was not a pragmatic issue until the military successes of the government in the 2006–2007 war in Somalia. Assertions of sovereignty in January 2007 by the TFG leadership sparked riots in Somaliland.

On July 1, 2007, the state of Maakhir was declared in eastern Sanaag. The polity's leaders claimed independence from both Puntland and Somaliland, but Maakhir was later officially incorporated into Puntland in January 2009.

On 20 July 2013, an agreement between local elders in the south of Sanaag Region and the Government of Somaliland led to the defection of the fighters in an attempt to combine the previously warring forces. "We had discussions and we agreed to work together on security in the area," Somaliland information minister Abdullahi Ukuse, adding that "the defecting force is made up of 500 fighters, 13 technicals and six lorries. These fighters were previously adversaries of the [Somaliland] military. The two forces are now one army." Other sources estimated that somewhere between 500 and 800 soldiers defected and integrated with the Somaliland National Army. A defecting Khaatumo state commander said he was happy that he joined the Somaliland troops, promising to help beef up security in the region.

On 12 June 2014, heavily armed Somaliland National Army entered Hingalol town. According to Puntland MP Abdihakim Abdullahi, they arrived in 13 battle wagons and were repeatedly told by local elders to leave the town or they would encounter resistance. Puntland elder Garad Abdullahi Ali Eid similarly indicated that before the Somaliland forces' began their march toward the area, Puntland clan elders had met with them and requested that they not enter the town ahead of a scheduled June 15 clan convention.

Sool

 Sool is a disputed region, claimed as sovereign territory by both the Somaliland and Puntland State of Somalia. Under the government of Siad Barre, Sool was not a separate region, but part of the larger Nugaal province, with the capital city of Garowe. It was separated from Nugaal in the 1980s.

According to the UN Security Council, on 17 September, fighting broke out between forces loyal to the self-declared independent republic of “Somaliland” and the semi-autonomous region of “Puntland” in Laascaanood, the capital of the disputed Sool region. Although the fighting started as a result of intra-clan tensions, it continued sporadically through September, drawing security forces from both “Somaliland” and “Puntland” and resulting in a high number of casualties. My Special Representative and his team urged senior “Somaliland” and “Puntland” officials to de-escalate the situation and reduce tensions in the region. In October, the situation in the Sool and Sanaag regions deteriorated further, with increased fighting between both parties. On
15 October, after heavy fighting which resulted in at least 10 deaths, “Somaliland” troops took control of Laascaanood. In the aftermath, “Puntland” mobilized its forces to regain control of the area and repel what they considered an invasion by “Somaliland” authorities and foreign elements. “Somaliland” rejected the allegations and vowed to continue the struggle until the region was liberated. In Sool, clashes were reported
in Taleh on 28 November between armed men from the Dhulbahante clan and Puntland forces. Those clashes reportedly resulted in the killing of 12 people, including 11 civilians, and injury to several others. “Somaliland” was relatively calm. Isolated armed clashes were reported in the disputed Sool, Sanaag, and Cayn regions on 27 and 28 November. Tension was high in early December following reports of a military build-up along the border between “Somaliland” and Puntland, but no further incidents were reported. Tension between Puntland and “Somaliland” increased over the contested Sool and Sanaag regions. The visit by the President of “Somaliland”, Ahmed Mohamed Mohamoud Silanyo, to the coastal town of Laasqoray in the disputed Sanaag region on 16 March triggered a military build-up from both sides. Accusations made by senior Puntland officials that “Somaliland” was supporting Al-Shabaab further strained relations. “Somaliland” refuted the allegations and called upon the Federal Government to intervene. On 15 April, “Somaliland” deployed its forces to the disputed Sool region and, on the same day, occupied the town of Taleex. The troops left the town the next day, after less than 24 hours. Tension in the disputed Sool region grew when “Somaliland” forces seized the town of Taleex on 12 June and disrupted a conference organized by leaders, elders and supporters of the self-declared “Khatumo State”. The tension escalated when the Government of Puntland reinforced its military presence in the contested region. On 26 June, “Somaliland” forces withdrew from Taleex, leaving behind a pro-“Somaliland” Dhulbahante militia. The “Khatumo” leaders relocated to Saaxdheer, an area in the Sool region near the Ethiopian border, from where one of the “Khatumo” founders and a parliamentarian, Ali Khalif Galayr, was elected the new President of “Khatumo” on 14 August. On 27 August, “Somaliland” forces captured Saaxdheer and have since occupied the area. In the northern region of Sool, claimed by both “Somaliland” and Puntland, fighting resulted in several deaths among various rival Dhulbahante sub-clans with opposing loyalties to “Somaliland”, Puntland and the Khatumo aspiration. Armed Forces of “Somaliland” intervened in the fighting and are currently based in Sadher, near the Ethiopian border. Western areas of “Somaliland” remained relatively peaceful, while the Sool, Sanaag and Cayn regions experienced intermittent armed clashes between “Somaliland” forces and militias supporting aspirations for a new state of “Khatumo”. In February, attacks by Dulbahante militia supporting the separatist “Khatumo” movement against “Somaliland” forces in the Sool and Sanaag regions resulted in the death of one “Somaliland” and two Khatumo combatants; the security situation stabilized in March, however.

Ayn
The area, centered on the town of Buuhoodle,  is also disputed by Somaliland and Puntland. According to Somaliland, the so-called Ayn area claimed by Puntland remains part of the Togdheer region. Somaliland disputes the territorial claims of Puntland, which wrote the claim on the portion of Togdheere into their 1998 charter. In 2011, tension between the two regions developed as a result of fighting between the “Somaliland” forces and militias belonging to
Sool-Sanaag-Cayn, which were reportedly backed by neighbouring “Puntland”. Disagreement over water holes in the disputed area of Buuhoodle led to fighting in late February between the “Somaliland” army and Sool-Sanaag-Cayn
militias; the latter was reportedly backed by “Puntland” forces. A tentative ceasefire has held since March, aided by “Puntland’s” withdrawal and “Somaliland” peacebuilding measures. However, Buuhoodle remains a militarized zone, and the conflict may resume as competition for water resources and pasture in droughtaffected areas increases. After months of negotiations, initiated by the “Somaliland” President, a reconciliation conference was held from 23 to 26 June for the Sool region, between the Sool-Sanag-Cayn alliances and the Dhulbahante sub-clan. The conference resulted in an agreement covering prisoner release, illegal land-grabbing and digging of boreholes. Meanwhile, a survey organized by an officially appointed committee found support for an expansion in the number of political parties allowed to register.  Las Anod experienced killings and violent attacks owing to the disagreement between “Somaliland”, “Puntland” and Sool-Sanag-Cayn alliances over territory. “Somaliland” forces and Sool-Sanag-Cayn militia fought inMay, and “Puntland” and “Somaliland” clashed in August. Proposed oil drilling north of Las
Anod by a commercial partner of “Puntland” added to existing tensions. The authorities in “Puntland” and “Somaliland” continued to exchange hostile rhetoric over the disputed regions of Sool and Sanaag. On 8 October, the President of “Somaliland” visited the disputed town of Laascaanood. In a press statement, the “Puntland” administration warned that this might ignite conflict in the area. On 9 November, “Puntland” warned “Somaliland” not to interfere in clan disputes and accused its administration of stirring up public unrest and causing the displacement of people in the Erigavo district of Sanaag region In 2012 Following a meeting between President Silanyo of “Somaliland” and Suleiman Esse Ahmed Haglatosie, the leader of the militia of the Sool, Sanaag and Cayn (SSC) regions of northern Somalia, in Dubai on 27 June, the SSC militia agreed to lay down arms and enter into talks with the “Somaliland” administration. The SSC leader promised to start disbanding his militia and hand over the weaponry at his disposal to the “Somaliland” administration. From 16 to 23 July 2012, Mr. Haglatosie also visited Garoowe to consult the “Puntland” leadership, seeking a negotiated end to the conflict in the region. In “Somaliland”, renewed military activities by the self-declared “Khaatumo State” led to armed clashes in the disputed Sool, Sanaag and Cayn areas in June and July 2012. In addition, there was tension between “Khaatumo State” and “Puntland”. Al-Shabaab undertook frequent troop movements from southern and central Somalia to “Somaliland” and “Puntland”, although the insurgents’ focus on those areas was more on recruitment than terrorist activity. “Puntland” also faced continuous challenges from the Al-Shabaab-linked Galgala insurgents, freelance militias, and pirates, whose criminal activities on the mainland intensified during the reporting period. Relations between “Somaliland” and “Puntland” remained strained. On 19 January, Dhulbahante clan leaders and politicians from Sool, Sanaag and Cayn announced the formation of a new administration, called “Khaatumo State”. Sool and Sanaag regions are claimed by both “Puntland” and “Somaliland”, whose forces continued to clash over the control of towns and villages. This resulted in displacement and intensified clan wars over grazing, water and other natural resources. Demonstrations were held in support of the new administration, demanding the withdrawal of “Somaliland” troops from Laascaanood.The dispute between “Somaliland” and the newly proclaimed “Khaatumo State”, in addition to clan-related violence, resulted in fatal clashes in Buuhoodle and Sool. While Al-Shabaab continued to lose ground in south-central Somalia, there were reports of it strengthening its alliance with militias in the Galgala mountain area in “Puntland”. Insurgents reportedly aligned with Al-Shabaab clashed with local authorities. “Puntland’s” security situation was also characterized by renewed hostility against foreign involvement in the exploitation of natural
resources. Separately, in the Sool and Sanaag regions, tensions were reported on 4 May and 15 June following a Puntland military build-up around Tukaraq, Sool Region, and armed clashes between the “Somaliland” army and a militia that supports the separatist “Khatumo” movement.

Armed clashes

2007 Somaliland capture of Las Anod

In October 2007, the conflict mushroomed into a regional conflict over control of the city of Las Anod, as Somaliland regular army forces mobilized from their base in the town of Adhicadeeye, west of the city, and entered the conflict. Puntland was slow to mobilize a counter-attack, as Puntland's weak economy and overstretched military obligations in Mogadishu prevented a rapid response. After getting the city under its control, Somaliland moved Sool's regional administration into Las Anod. Between 10 and 20 people were reported to be dead.

2010 clashes

In 2010, Ethiopian and Somaliland forces engaged an autonomist militia in northern Somalia's Sool region in a bid to pacify the region ahead of the 2010 Somaliland presidential election. While Ethiopian troops had entered southern Somalia to fight Islamist militants on previous occasions, this is believed to be the first time that they had done so in Somaliland, a region generally seen as more stable than Somalia.

2016 clashes
On 18 July, at least five soldiers have been killed after Puntland and Somaliland troops clashed in Sanaag. A Puntland army commander confirmed that three Puntland soldiers and two high ranking Somaliland military officers were killed.

Somaliland captured a prominent member of the Puntland administration, Mohamed Farah Adan, who was the former vice Minister of Justice and is currently a member of the Puntland parliament. He was detained for a week in Erigavo and released the following month.

2018 clashes

In January and May 2018, the Battle of Tukaraq between Somaliland and Puntland troops left 200 to 300 people dead and led to the displacement of 2700 families. At the end of July the Intergovernmental Authority on Development and United Nations Assistance Mission in Somalia mediated a ceasefire agreement between Somaliland and Puntland, but by the end of the year neither parties publicly supported the terms of the agreement.

Other viewpoints 
Former president of Somalia Hassan Sheikh Mohamud stated his opinion whilst in office that Puntland is made up of two and a half regions (Bari, Nugal and northern Mudug), which goes against Puntland's claim of Sool and Sanaag.

Furthermore, in preparation for the Somali presidential election of 2017 the communiqué released by the office of Presidency of Somalia regarding Somalia's National Leadership Forum referred to the disputed territory as Gobollada Sool iyo Sanaag ee Soomaaliland (Somaliland's Sool and Sanaag regions). Somalia's National Leadership Forum was chaired by the President of Somalia Hassan Sheikh Mohamud, and attended by the Speaker of Parliament Mohamed Osman Jawari, Prime Minister Omar Abdirashid Ali Sharmarke, Presidents of South West, Galmudug, Hirshabelle, states of Somalia and the Vice President of Puntland state.

See also

 2010 Ayn clashes
 Maakhir
 Khatumo State

References

Notes
 H. J. de Blij, Peter O. Muller, Antoinette WinklerPrins, Jan Nijman, The World Today: Concepts and Regions in Geography, (John Wiley & Sons: 2010)
 Puntland Constitution

Further reading
 Hoehne, Markus V. 2007: Puntland and Somaliland clashing in northern Somalia: Who cuts the Gordian knot?, published online on 7 November 2007. https://web.archive.org/web/20090703051338/http://hornofafrica.ssrc.org/Hoehne/
 Hoehne, Markus V. 2009: Mimesis and mimicry in dynamics of state and identity formation in northern Somalia, Africa 79/2, pp. 252–281.

21st century in Somaliland
2000s in Somaliland
2002 in Somaliland
2002 in Somalia
2007 in Somaliland
2007 in Somalia
2008 in Somalia
21st century in Somalia
Battles involving Somalia
Conflicts in 2016
Conflicts in 2018
Foreign relations of Somaliland
History of Somaliland
Separatism in Somalia
Somali Civil War
Sool, Somaliland
Territorial disputes of Somalia
Wars involving Somaliland
Wars involving Somalia
Puntland–Somaliland dispute